The 49th New York Infantry Regiment was an infantry regiment in the Union Army during the American Civil War.

Service
The 49th New York Infantry was organized at Buffalo, New York and mustered in for three years service on September 18, 1861 under the command of Colonel Daniel D. Bidwell.

The regiment was attached to Stevens' 3rd Brigade, W. F. Smith's Division, Army of the Potomac, to March 1862. 3rd Brigade, 2nd Division, IV Corps, Army of the Potomac, to May 1862. 3rd Brigade, 2nd Division, VI Corps, Army of the Potomac, and Army of the Shenandoah, to June 1865.

The 49th New York Infantry mustered out of service on June 27, 1865.

Detailed service
Left New York for Washington, D.C., September 20, 1861. Camp near Lewinsville, defenses of Washington. D.C., until March 1862. Action at Dranesville, Va., December 20, 1861. Advance on Manassas, Va., March 10–15, 1862. Ordered to the Peninsula, Va., March 22. Action at Lee's Mills April 5. Siege of Yorktown April 5-May 4. Lee's Mills April 16. Battle of Williamsburg May 5. Mechanicsville May 23–24. Seven Days Battles before Richmond June 25-July 1. Garnett's Farm June 27. Garnett's and Golding's Farm June 28. Savage's Station June 29. White Oak Swamp June 30. Malvern Hill July 1. At Harrison's Landing until August 16. Movement to Fort Monroe, then to Centreville August 16–27. In works at Centreville August 28–31, and cover Pope's retreat to Fairfax Court House September 1. Maryland Campaign September 6–22. Battle of Crampton's Pass, South Mountain September 14. Battle of Antietam September 16–17. Duty in Maryland until October 29. Movement to Falmouth, Va., October 29-November 19. Battle of Fredericksburg December 12–15. "Mud March" January 20–24, 1863. At Falmouth until April 27. Chancellorsville Campaign April 27-May 6. Operations about Franklin's Crossing April 29-May 2. Battle of Maryes Heights, Fredericksburg, May 3. Salem Heights May 3–4. Banks' Ford May 4. Deep Run Ravine June 5–13. Battle of Gettysburg July 2–4. Pursuit of Lee July 5–24. Fairfield, Pa., July 7. Duty on line of the Rappahannock until October. Bristoe Campaign October 9–22. Advance to line of the Rappahannock November 7–8. Rappahannock Station November 7. Mine Run Campaign November 26-December 2. Duty near Brandy Station until May 1864. Campaign from the Rapidan to the James May 3-June 15. Battle of the Wilderness May 5–7. Spotsylvania May 8–12. Spotsylvania Court House May 12–21. Assault on the Salient or "Bloody Angle" May 12. North Anna River May 23–26. On line of the Pamunkey May 26–28. Totopotomoy May 28–31. Cold Harbor June 1–12. Before Petersburg June 17–18. Siege of Petersburg June 17-July 9. Jerusalem Plank Road June 22–23. Moved to Washington, D.C., July 9–11. Repulse of Early's attack on Fort Stevens and the northern defenses of Washington July 11–12. Pursuit of Early July 14–22. Sheridan's Shenandoah Valley Campaign August 7-November 28. Near Charlestown August 21–22. Gilbert's Ford, Opequan Creek, September 13. Battle of Winchester September 19. Fisher's Hill September 22. Battle of Cedar Creek October 19. Duty in the Shenandoah Valley until December. Moved to Washington, then to Petersburg December 13–16. Siege of Petersburg December 16, 1864 to April 2, 1865. Fort Fisher, Petersburg, March 25, 1865. Appomattox Campaign March 28-April 9. Assault on and fall of Petersburg April 2. Pursuit of Lee April 3–9. Sailor's Creek April 6. Appomattox Court House April 9. Surrender of Lee and his army. March to Danville, Va., April 23–27. Duty there until May 18. Moved to Richmond, then to Washington May 18-June 2. Corps Review June 8.

Casualties
The regiment lost a total of 320 men during service; 15 officers and 126 enlisted men killed or mortally wounded, 5 officers and 174 enlisted men died of disease.

Commanders
 Colonel Daniel D. Bidwell - promoted to brigadier general August 11, 1864
 Colonel Erastus D. Holt - commanded at the Battle of Fort Stevens while at the rank of captain after Ltc Johnson was mortally wounded; killed in action at the Third Battle of Petersburg
 Colonel George H. Selkirk
 Lieutenant Colonel William C. Alberger - commanded at the Battle of Antietam until wounded in action
 Lieutenant Colonel George W. Johnson - commanded at the Battle of Antietam while at the rank of major after Ltc Alberger was wounded; commanded at the Battles of the Wilderness and Spotsylvania Court House; mortally wounded in action at the Battle of Fort Stevens

Notable members
 2nd Lieutenant John P. McVeane, Company D - Medal of Honor recipient for action at the Battle of Chancellorsville

See also

 List of New York Civil War regiments
 New York in the Civil War

References
 Bidwell, Frederick David. History of the Forty-Ninth New York Volunteers (Albany, NY: J. B. Lyon Company, Printers), 1916.
 Dyer, Frederick H. A Compendium of the War of the Rebellion (Des Moines, IA:  Dyer Pub. Co.), 1908.
 Henry, John N. Turn Them Out to Die Like a Mule: The Civil War Letters of John N. Henry, 49th New York, 1861-1865 (Leesburg, VA: Gauley Mount Press), 1995.  
Attribution

External links
 Guidons of the 49th New York Infantry
 49th New York Infantry monument at Gettysburg
 49th New York Infantry monument at Spotsylvania

Military units and formations established in 1861
1861 establishments in New York (state)
Military units and formations disestablished in 1865
Infantry 049